The Global Water Challenge (GWC) is a non-profit organization to provide safe drinking water, sanitation, and hygiene education worldwide to people who lack these services. Launched by a diverse coalition of corporations, foundations, and aid organizations, the GWC is a unique partnership to build healthy communities and provide sustainable solutions to ensure the availability of potable water for those in need. The goal of the GWC is to bring safe water and sanitation to millions by identifying and multiplying the solutions that work. 

GWC has worked with other non-profit organizations such as Blood: Water Mission.

External links

Water resource policy
Water-related charities